Amata dilateralis is a moth of the family Erebidae. It was described by George Hampson in 1898. It is found in Tanzania.

References

 

Endemic fauna of Tanzania
dilateralis
Moths described in 1898
Moths of Africa